Staroabsalyamovo (İśke Äpsäläm) is a rural locality (a selo) and the administrative centre of Urshaksky Selsoviet, Aurgazinsky District, Bashkortostan, Russia. The population was 433 as of 2010. There are 8 streets.

Geography 
Staroabsalyamovo is located 23 km northwest of Tolbazy (the district's administrative centre) by road. Kurmanayevo is the nearest rural locality.

References 

Rural localities in Aurgazinsky District